Battir is a Palestinian village in the West Bank, 6.4 km west of Bethlehem, and southwest of Jerusalem. In 2017, the village had a population of 4,696. In 2014, Battir was inscribed in the UNESCO World Heritage Site as a "world heritage site" in the State of Palestine, under the name Battir – Land of Olives and Vines — Cultural Landscape of Southern Jerusalem.

Battir was inhabited during the Byzantine and Islamic periods, and in the Ottoman and British Mandate censuses its population was recorded as primarily Muslim. In former times, the city lay along the route from Jerusalem to Bayt Jibrin. Battir is situated just above the modern route of the Jaffa–Jerusalem railway, which served as the armistice line between Israel and Jordan from 1949 until the Six-Day War, when it was occupied by Israel. In 2007, Battir had a population of about 4,000.

History

Ancient period

Battir is built just north east of Khirbet el-Yahud, an archeological site that comprises the ruins of ancient Betar. It was continuously inhabited since the Iron Age up until the second century CE, when the Romans destroyed it during the Bar Kokhba revolt. The Arabic name Battir preserves the village's ancient name.

Spearheads, stone balls, vessels, two cisterns, and coins from both the First Jewish-Roman War and the Bar Kokhba revolt were found in Battir in 1907 when three local families who owned the land near the ruin began cleaning the stones. The Warren Cup is also said to have been found near Battir.

According to one Jewish tradition, it is also the site of the tomb of the Tannaic sage Eleazar of Modi'im.

Byzantine period 
A mosaic from the late Byzantine or early Islamic period was found in Battir.

Ottoman period
In 1596, Battir appeared in Ottoman tax registers as a village in the Nahiya of Quds in the Liwa of Quds. It had a population of 24 households and two bachelors, all Muslims, and paid taxes on wheat, summer crops or fruit trees, and goats or beehives; a total of 4,800 Akçe. All of the revenue went to a Waqf.

In 1838 it was noted as Bittir, a Muslim village in the Beni Hasan district, west of Jerusalem.

French explorer Victor Guérin visited the place in 1863, while an Ottoman village list from about 1870 showed that Battir had a population of 239, in a total of 62 houses, though that population count only included men. It was further noted that it had "a beautiful spring flowing through the courtyard of the mosque".

In 1883, the PEF's Survey of Western Palestine described Battir as a moderate sized village, on the precipitous slope of a deep valley.

In 1896 the population of Bettir was estimated to be about 750 persons.

In the 20th century, Battir's development was linked to its location alongside the railroad to Jerusalem, which provided access to the marketplace as well as income from passengers who disembarked to refresh themselves en route.

British Mandate period
In the 1922 census of Palestine, conducted by the British Mandate authorities, Batir had an all Muslim population of 542 persons, increasing in the 1931 census to 758; 755 Muslims, two Christians and one Jew, in 172 houses.

In the 1945 statistics the population of Battir was 1,050, all Muslims, with a total of 8,028 dunams of land according to an official land and population survey. Of this, 1,805 dunams were plantations and irrigable land, 2,287 for cereals, while 73 dunams were built-up (urban) land.

Jordanian period
During the 1948 war, most of the villagers had fled, but Mustafa Hassan and a few others stayed. At night they would light candles in the houses, and in the morning they would take out the cattle. When nearing the village, the Israelis thought Battir was still inhabited and gave up attacking. The armistice line was drawn near the railroad, with Battir ending up just meters to the east of Jordan's border with Israel. At least 30% of Battir's land lies on the Israeli side of the Green Line, as well as a few of its buildings, but the villagers were allowed to keep it in return for preventing damage to the railway, thus being the only Palestinians officially allowed to cross into Israel and work their lands before the Six-Day War. The parts of Battir falling on the Israeli side of the Green Line are officially within the territorial jurisdiction of the Mateh Yehuda Regional Council but do not have a local committee of their own and the Council's authority is not exercised there.

Battir came under Jordanian administration following the 1948 Arab–Israeli War and was annexed by Jordan in 1950.

The Jordanian census of 1961 found 1,321 inhabitants in Battir.

Post-1967
Since the Six-Day War in 1967, the status of Battir changed from Jordanian occupation and annexation to Israeli occupation. The population in the 1967 census was 1445.

Since the signing of the Oslo II Accord in 1995, Battir has been administered by the Palestinian National Authority (PNA). It is governed by a village council currently administrated by nine members appointed by the PNA. 23.7% of the village's lands were classified as Area B, while the remaining 76.3% were classified as Area C.

In 2007, Battir had a population of 3,967, in 2012 the population was estimated at about 4,500.

Geography
Battir is located 6.4 km (horizontal distance) north-west of Bethlehem on a hill above Wadi el-Jundi (lit. "Valley of the Soldier"), which runs southwest through the Judean hills to the coastal plain. The PEF's Survey of Western Palestine in 1883 described the city's natural defenses, saying its houses stand upon rock terraces, having a rocky scarp below; thus from the north the place is very strong, whilst on the south a narrow neck between two ravine heads connects the hill with the main ridge. At an altitude of around 760 m above sea level, Battir's summers are temperate, and its winters mild with occasional snowfall. The average annual temperature is 16o C.

Ancient irrigation system and terraces
Battir has a unique irrigation system that utilizes man-made terraces (habbai'l) and a system of manually diverting water via sluice gates. The Roman-era network is still in use, fed by seven springs which have provided fresh water for 2,000 years. The irrigation system runs through a steep valley near the Green Line where a section of the Ottoman-era Hejaz Railway was laid. Battir's eight main clans take turns each day to water the village's crops. Hence a local saying that in Battir "a week lasts eight days, not seven." According to anthropologist Giovanni Sontana of UNESCO, "There are few, if any, places left in the immediate region where such a traditional method of agriculture remains, not only intact, but as a functioning part of the village."

In 2007, the village of Battir sued the Israeli Defense Ministry to try to force them to change the planned route of the Israeli West Bank barrier which would cut through part of Battir's 2,000-year-old irrigation system, which is still in use. The Israel Nature and Parks Authority (INPA), which approved the fence’s original route in 2005, changed its mind and wrote in a 13-page policy paper that Battir’s terraces were also an Israeli heritage site and should be carefully safeguarded, stating that agricultural terraces around Battir attesting to millennia-old methods of farming in the region will be irreversibly harmed by the fence, no matter how narrow its route. It was the first time an Israeli government agency expressed opposition to the construction of a segment of the fence. This affidavit was one of four expert opinions that contended the fence would decimate the unique farming system, and in early May 2013, the Israeli High Court of Justice ruled that the Defense Ministry must explain “why should the route of the separation barrier in the Battir village area not be nullified or changed, and alternately why should the barrier not be reconfigured.” The Defense Ministry has to submit a new plan for securing the border that will not destroy Battir by July 2, 2013. A separate petition against the separation barrier has also been filed by the nearby Jewish city Beitar Illit, fearing that it would prevent them from expanding the settlement.

In 2011 UNESCO awarded Battir a $15,000 prize for "Safeguarding and Management of Cultural Landscapes" due to its care for its ancient terraces and irrigation system.

In May 2012, the Palestinian National Authority sent a delegation to UNESCO headquarters in Paris to discuss the possibility of adding Battir to its World Heritage List. The PNA's deputy minister of tourism, Hamadan Taha, said that the organization wants to "maintain it as a Palestinian and humanitarian heritage," making special note of its historic terraces and irrigation systems. the nomination of Battir was blocked at the last minute because the formal submission was too late. In a document concerning the damage the separation barrier would do to the area, the Israel Nature and Parks Authority (INPA) noted "The struggle of our neighbors to name the area a World Heritage Site places us in an embarrassing position, and we should work together with them to protect the landscape."

In January 2015, according to the village mayor Akram Badir, the Israeli Supreme Court rejected the IDF request to build the separation barrier through the village

Archaeology
An old Roman bath fed by a spring is located in the middle of the village. Archaeologist D. Ussishkin dates the village to the Iron Age, and states that at the time of the Revolt it was a village of between one and two thousand people chosen by Bar Kochba for its spring, defensible hilltop location, and proximity to the main Jerusalem-Gaza road. A Roman inscription was also discovered near one of the city's natural springs on which are inscribed the names of the Fifth Macedonian Legion and the Eleventh Claudian Legion, which said legions presumably took part in the siege of the city during Emperor Hadrian's reign.

There isn't any evidence of habitation in the period immediately after the Revolt.

Sister cities
  Luton, United Kingdom

References

Bibliography

External links

 Welcome To Battir
 Battir, Welcome to Palestine
 Survey of Western Palestine, Map 17: IAA, Wikimedia commons
 Battir Village (Fact Sheet), Applied Research Institute–Jerusalem (ARIJ)
 Battir Village Profile, ARIJ
 Battir Village Area Photo, ARIJ
 The priorities and needs for development in Battir village based on the community and local authorities’ assessment, ARIJ
 www.battir.i8.com
 Battir village photos
 Battir Video

Seam Zone
Populated places in the Bethlehem Governorate
Towns in the West Bank
World Heritage Sites in Danger
World Heritage Sites in the State of Palestine
Municipalities of the State of Palestine